Three prime repair exonuclease 1 is an enzyme that in humans is encoded by the TREX1 gene.

Function 

This gene encodes the major 3'->5' DNA exonuclease in human cells. The protein is a non-processive exonuclease that may serve a proofreading function for a human DNA polymerase. It is also a component of the SET complex, and acts to rapidly degrade 3' ends of nicked DNA during granzyme A-mediated cell death. Mutations in this gene result in Aicardi-Goutieres syndrome, chilblain lupus, RVCL (Retinal Vasculopathy with Cerebral Leukodystrophy), and Cree encephalitis. Multiple transcript variants encoding different isoforms have been found for this gene.

Clinical relevance 
Mutations within the TREX1 gene cause familial chilblain lupus. The TREX1 polymorphisms confer susceptibility to systemic lupus erythematosus. Missense mutations of the TREX1 gene significantly downregulate its exonucleolytic capacity and result in the accumulation of nucleic acids. The build-up of the nucleic acids within the cytoplasm stimulates type-I interferon responses that could trigger autoimmune responses. The region containing the TREX1 gene (3p21.31) has been linked to COVID-19 severity in a recent genome-wide association study. This might explain the occurrence of chilblain like lesions in patients infected with SARS-CoV-2.

TREX1 helps HIV‑1 to evade cytosolic sensing by degrading viral cDNA in the cytoplasm

Mutations in TREX1 can give cause failure to appropriately remove ribonucleotides misincorporated into DNA.  The removal process is ordinary performed by ribonucleotide excision repair.  In humans, a defect in this process can give rise to Aicardi-Goutieres syndrome involving microcephaly and neuroinflammation.

References

Further reading

External links
  GeneReviews/NCBI/NIH/UW entry on Aicardi-Goutières Syndrome
  OMIM entries on Aicardi-Goutieres syndrome